Kristine Froseth (born 21 September 1996) is an American and Norwegian actress. She is known for playing Kelly Aldrich in the Netflix series The Society and Alaska Young in the Hulu series Looking for Alaska. In 2022, she starred in the Showtime series The First Lady as young Betty Ford.

Early life
Froseth was born on 21 September 1996 in Summit, New Jersey, to Norwegian parents. Her childhood was spent traveling back and forth between Oslo and New Jersey due to her father's work.

Career
Froseth started modeling after being discovered on a catwalk audition at Ski Storsenter in Norway, and was also scouted by IMG Models while in New Jersey at a local mall fashion show. She has modeled for brands such as Prada, Armani, Juicy Couture, Miu Miu and H&M.

Her acting career began when a casting director found her photos and encouraged her to audition for the film adaptation of John Green's novel Looking for Alaska. This film adaptation was never made. In 2016, she was cast in the pilot for a potential series adaptation of Let the Right One In. Froseth began her acting career with the 2017 film Rebel in the Rye. In 2018, she starred in two Netflix movies, Sierra Burgess Is a Loser and Apostle, and a Sky miniseries, The Truth About the Harry Quebert Affair.

On 9 May 2018, it was announced that Hulu would be adapting the John Green novel Looking for Alaska into an 8-episode miniseries. On 30 October 2018, Green announced that Froseth would be playing Alaska Young, one of the main characters. She stars in the 2021 Amazon Prime Video film Birds of Paradise directed by Sarah Adina Smith.

In June 2022, Froseth was cast to star in Apple TV+'s The Buccaneers.  On 21 July 2022 Season 2, episode 1 of American Horror Stories aired on FX on Hulu in the U.S. Froseth played the episode's protagonist, Coby Rae Dellum.

Filmography

References

External links

 
 

1996 births
Living people
21st-century American actresses
21st-century Norwegian actresses
Actresses from New Jersey
American film actresses
American people of Norwegian descent
American television actresses
Female models from New Jersey
Norwegian female models
Norwegian film actresses
Norwegian television actresses
People from Frogn
People from Summit, New Jersey